The Parthenon is a former temple in Athens, Greece

Parthenon may also refer to:
 Parthenon, Arkansas
 Parthenon (Nashville), a replica of the Athens Parthenon
 The Parthenon (newspaper), a student newspaper of Marshall University
 The Parthenon (painting), an 1871 painting by Frederic Edwin Church
 Parthenon: Rise of the Aegean, a board game
 The Parthenon (mountain), a mountain of the Du Cane Range, in Tasmania, Australia

See also
 Pantheon (disambiguation)
 Operation Parthenon, a 1964 British plan for military intervention in Zanzibar
 Parthenon Zihuatanejo, the palatial house of Arturo Durazo Moreno in Mexico